Emma Cecilie Norsgaard Bjerg née Jørgensen (born 26 July 1999) is a Danish cyclist, who currently rides for UCI Women's WorldTeam . Norsgaard married cyclist Mikkel Bjerg in 2021.

Major results

2016
 1st  Road race, National Road Championships
 6th Road race, UCI Junior Road World Championships
2017
 1st  Time trial, National Junior Road Championships
 2nd Road race, UCI Junior Road World Championships
 UEC European Junior Road Championships
2nd Road race
3rd Time trial
 3rd Overall Energiewacht Tour Juniors
2018
 2nd Road race, National Road Championships
2020
 1st  Road race, National Road Championships
 1st Stage 1 Setmana Ciclista Valenciana
 3rd Omloop van het Hageland
2021
 1st  Time trial, National Road Championships
 1st  Overall Festival Elsy Jacobs
1st  Points classification
1st  Young rider classification 
1st Stages 1 & 2
 1st Stage 6 Giro Rosa
 2nd Omloop Het Nieuwsblad
 2nd Le Samyn
 2nd Scheldeprijs
 3rd Overall Healthy Ageing Tour
1st  Young rider classification
 3rd Overall Thüringen Ladies Tour
1st  Young rider classification 
1st Stage 1
 6th Paris–Roubaix
 8th Nokere Koerse
 9th Gent–Wevelgem
2022
 1st Le Samyn
 2nd Omloop van het Hageland
 5th Gent–Wevelgem
 6th Omloop Het Nieuwsblad
 6th Classic Brugge–De Panne
2023
 2nd Women Cycling Pro Costa De Almería
 4th Omloop Het Nieuwsblad

References

External links

1999 births
Living people
Danish female cyclists
People from Silkeborg
Olympic cyclists of Denmark
Cyclists at the 2020 Summer Olympics
Sportspeople from the Central Denmark Region
20th-century Danish women
21st-century Danish women